Mount Sinai Memorial Park Cemetery is the largest Jewish cemetery organization in California.

History 
Mount Sinai Memorial Parks and Mortuaries, owned by Sinai Temple of Los Angeles, refers to two Jewish cemeteries in the Los Angeles metropolitan area.  The original cemetery property is located at 5950 Forest Lawn Drive in the Hollywood Hills of Los Angeles. The cemetery was originally established in 1953 by the neighboring Forest Lawn-Hollywood Hills Cemetery. In 1959, it became an exclusively Jewish cemetery, and in 1967 it was acquired by Sinai Temple, the oldest and largest Conservative synagogue in Los Angeles, which dedicated its mortuary and cemetery resources to all members of the Jewish community in and around the city.  Numerous stars and celebrities from the entertainment industry are interred in the park which is located down the street from Warner Bros studios.

Artwork 
Throughout the different sections of Mount Sinai Hollywood Hills, one encounters various forms of artwork including mosaics, sculpture, fountains and carvings. The park also features a memorial monument dedicated to the six million Jews who were murdered in the Holocaust by renowned Jewish artist, Bernard Zakheim. The six three-dimensional figures, all rendered in burnt and tortured wood, represent six heroic Jewish figures. Rising from the stones of the memorial is a flame that symbolizes the eternal spirit of the six million and the rebirth of Israel from the ashes of the Holocaust.

Expansion to Simi Valley, California
In 1997, faced with dwindling space at the original Hollywood Hills location and recognizing the need for Jewish burial properties for future generations, Mount Sinai Memorial Parks expanded by opening its second memorial park, Mount Sinai Simi Valley.

Genizah and book burials
Mount Sinai offers a Genizah program where members of the community can drop off worn out siddurim (prayer books), Torah scrolls, tallit, tzitzit, tefellin and other sacred materials which contain the Hebrew name of God, for burial at a later date. Several times each year, Mount Sinai invites school groups to Mount Sinai Simi Valley where they will conduct a burial service for the books while learning about this ancient Jewish tradition.

Notable interments

A
 Berle Adams (1917–2009), music producer
 Pearl "Polly" Adler (1900–1962), Manhattan brothel operator and author of House is Not a Home
 Irwin Allen (1916–1991), director, producer, writer
 Art Aragon (1927–2008), boxer
 Danny Arnold (1925–1995), film actor/editor/writer
 Eleanor Audley (1905–1991), actress, voice-over artist

B
 Dave Barry (1918–2001), actor and comedian
 Frances Bay (1919–2011), actress
 Herschel Bernardi (1923–1986), actor
 Sara Berner (1912–1969), actress
 Zina Bethune (1945–2012), actress
 Eli Broad (1933–2021), businessman and philanthropist
 Georgia Brown (1933–1992), actress and singer
 Edward Buzzell (1895–1985), director
 Joan Bilson (1938–2019), teacher and art collector

C
 Sid Caesar (1922–2014), comedian and actor
 Brett Cantor (1967–1993), music label executive, concert promoter and nightclub owner
 Charlie Cantor (1898–1966), actor
 June Carroll (1917–2004), lyricist, singer and actress
 Virginia Christine (1920–1996), actress, voice artist
 Lee J. Cobb (1911–1976), actor
 Martin Cohan (1932–2010), television writer and producer
 Ruth Cohen (1930–2008), actress (Seinfeld)
 Maxine Cooper (1924–2009), actress
 Stanley Cortez (1908–1997), cinematographer
 Irving Cottler (1918–1989), drummer
 Warren Cowan (1921–2008), publicist
 Harry Crane (1914–1999), American comedy writer
 Rosalind Cron (1925–2021), jazz musician, last surviving member of the International Sweethearts of Rhythm of the 1940s

D
 Mack David (1912–1993), composer

E
 Cass Elliot (1941–1974), singer for The Mamas & the Papas
 Ziggy Elman (1911–1968), big-band musician and composer

F
 Lee Farr (1927–2017), actor
 Fritz Feld (1900–1993), actor
 Norman Fell (1924–1998), actor
 Totie Fields (1930–1978), comedian
 Gerald Finnerman (1931–2011), cinematographer
 Bob Flanagan (1952–1996), performance artist and writer
 Dave Fleischer (1894–1979), film director and producer
 Helen Forrest (1917–1999), singer
 Bonnie Franklin (1944–2013), actress
 Karl Freund (1890–1969), cinematographer
 Murray Fromson (1929–2018), journalist

G
 Linda Gary (1944–1995), actress, voice actress
 Bruce Geller (1930–1978), producer
 Benny Goldberg (1918–2001), boxer
 Solomon W. Golomb (1932–2016), mathematician
 Saul Gorss (1908–1966), actor
 Michael Gordon (1909–1993), stage actor, stage and film director, maternal grandfather of Joseph Gordon-Levitt
 David Groh (1939–2008), actor
 Fred Grossinger (1936–1995), actor

H
 Billy Halop (1920–1976), actor
 Larry Harmon (1925–2008), actor and comedian (aka Bozo the Clown)
 Nat Hiken (1914–1968), award-winning writer, director, producer
 Arthur Hiller (1923–2016), director
 Gregg Hoffman (1963–2005), producer
 Peter Hurkos (1911–1988), psychic

K
 Irma Kalish (1924–2021), television writer
 Eddie Kane (1889–1969), actor
 Leonard Katzman (1927–1996), film and TV writer, producer, and director
 Walter Kent (1911–1994), composer and conductor
 Ruth Klüger (1931–2020), Professor Emerita of German Studies 
 Arnold Kopelson (1935–2018), film producer
 Suzanne Krull (1966–2013), actress

L
 David Landsberg  (1944–2018), T.V. and film comedy writer, producer and actor  
 John Larch (1914–2005), actor
 Sydney Lassick (1922–2003), actor
 Pinky Lee (1907–1993), actor and comedian
 Robert Q. Lewis (1920–1991), television personality, actor, and game show host
 Abraham M. Lurie (1923–2010), real estate developer

M
 Bruce Malmuth (1934–2005), director
 Ross Martin (1920–1981), actor
 Michael Masser (1941–2015), musician
 Sid Melton (1917–2011), actor
 Laurence Merrick (1926–1977), director and author
 Irving Mills (1894–1985), composer
 Marvin Minoff (1931–2009), film and television producer, executive producer of The Nixon Interviews
 Laurie Mitchell (1928–2018), actress

N
 Claudette Nevins (1937–2020), actress
 Lawrence R. Newman (1925–2011), deaf activist, educator and author
 Bill Novey (1948–1991), Special Effects Master/Head of Special Effects at Walt Disney Imagineering/co-founder of Art & Technology, Inc.

P
 Daniel Pearl (1963–2002), journalist
 Lefty Phillips (1919–1972), baseball coach and manager
 Ted Post (1918–2013), film director

R
 Martin Ragaway (1923–1989), motion picture and television writer
 Don Rickles (1926–2017), comedian and actor
 Larry Rickles (1970–2011), screenwriter, son of Don Rickles
 Mark Robson (1913–1978), director
 Shorty Rogers (1924–1994), jazz musician
 David Rose (1910–1990), composer
 Steven Rothenberg (1958–2009), film studio executive (Lions Gate, Artisan Entertainment)
 Mo Rothman (1919–2011), studio executive who persuaded Charlie Chaplin to return to the United States in 1972
 Tibor Rubin (1929–2015), Medal of Honor recipient

S
 Bob Saget (1956–2022), actor, comedian, and television host. The first host of America's Funniest Home Videos
 Walter Scharf (1910–2003), composer
 Bob Shad (1920–1985), music producer
 Al Sherman (1897–1973), songwriter
 Mitzi Shore (1930–2018), comedy club owner
 Phil Silvers (1911–1985), actor and comedian
 Fred Silverman (1937–2020), Television executive and producer.
 Sidney Skolsky (1905–1983), Hollywood reporter
 Hillel Slovak (1962–1988), guitarist for Red Hot Chili Peppers
 Howard Smit (1911–2009), film make-up artist who led efforts to establish the Academy Award for Best Makeup
 Milton Sperling (1912–1988), American film producer and screenwriter
 Wendie Jo Sperber (1958–2005), actress
 Florence Stanley (1924–2003), actress
 Dawn Steel (1946–1997), film executive and producer
 Leonard B. Stern (1923–2011), television producer, director and writer
 Harold J. Stone (1913–2005), actor

T
 Iwao Takamoto (1925–2007), animator
 Brandon Tartikoff (1949–1997), television executive, former president of NBC
 Irving Taylor (1914–1983), songwriter
 Mel Taylor (1933–1996), musician, drummer and percussionist for the Ventures
 Dick Tufeld (1926–2012), actor, announcer, narrator
 Mark Tulin (1948–2011), bass guitarist
 Saul Turteltaub (1932–2020), television writer and producer

V
 Bobby Van (1928–1980), actor and dancer

W
 Joseph Wapner (1919–2017), judge, television personality. The first judge to preside over The People's Court
 Bea Wain (1917–2017), singer
 Danny Wells (1941–2013), actor, voice actor and composer
 Paul G. Wexler (1929–1979), actor
 Jesse White (1917–1997), actor
 Harry Wilson (1897–1978), actor
 David Winters (1939–2019), actor, dancer, choreographer
 Jay Wolpert (1942–2022), television producer and screenwriter
 Than Wyenn (1919–2015), actor

Z
 Howard Zieff (1927–2009), director, advertising photographer

References

External links
 Official Mount Sinai Memorial Parks and Mortuaries website
 

1953 establishments in California
Cemeteries in Los Angeles
Jewish cemeteries in California
Jews and Judaism in Los Angeles
Hollywood Hills